Hsu Jen-feng (born 28 April 1979) is a Taiwanese football goalkeeper. He currently plays for Tatung F.C. He has played for the Chinese Taipei national football team and the Chinese Taipei national futsal team.

In the Intercity Football League 2007 season, he helped Tatung F.C. to win the championship, and he personally won the Best Goalkeeper Award.

External links

1979 births
Living people
Futsal goalkeepers
Taiwanese footballers
Taiwanese men's futsal players
Tatung F.C. players
Chinese Taipei international footballers
Association football goalkeepers